Uranophora albiplaga is a moth in the subfamily Arctiinae. It was described by Francis Walker in 1854. It is found in Mexico, Nicaragua, Costa Rica, Panama, Venezuela, Ecuador and Brazil.

References

Moths described in 1854
Euchromiina